Sathoddi Falls is a waterfall in Uttara Kannada District Located  from Yellapur and  from Sirsi ,  It is about 15 metres (49.2 feet) tall. The stream then flows into the backwaters of the Kodasalli Dam, into the Kali River.

References

External links

Waterfalls of Karnataka
Plunge waterfalls
Tourist attractions in Uttara Kannada district
Geography of Uttara Kannada district